Rosyita Eka Putri Sari (born 6 July 1996) is an Indonesian badminton player specializing in doubles. She is from PB. Djarum, a badminton club in Kudus, Central Java, having joined the club in 2011. She is the girls' and mixed doubles silver medalist of the 2014 World Junior Championships held in Alor Setar, Malaysia.

Career 
Putri Sari paired with Della Destiara Haris and started participating in the 2015 Austrian Open International Challenge but was stopped in the semifinals by British pair Heather Olver and Lauren Smith with a rubber sets 20–22, 21–19, 19–21. Better results were obtained one week later in the 2015 German Open Grand Prix Gold tournament as the runner-up of the tournament.

Achievements

BWF World Junior Championships 
Girls' doubles

Mixed doubles

BWF Grand Prix (2 titles, 1 runner-up) 
The BWF Grand Prix had two levels, the Grand Prix and Grand Prix Gold. It was a series of badminton tournaments sanctioned by the Badminton World Federation (BWF) and played between 2007 and 2017.

Women's doubles

  BWF Grand Prix Gold tournament
  BWF Grand Prix tournament

BWF International Challenge/Series (1 title, 2 runners-up) 
Women's doubles

  BWF International Challenge tournament
  BWF International Series tournament

BWF Junior International (2 titles, 1 runner-up) 
Girls' doubles

  BWF Junior International Grand Prix tournament
  BWF Junior International Challenge tournament
  BWF Junior International Series tournament
  BWF Junior Future Series tournament

Performance timeline

National team 
 Junior level

 Senior level

Individual competitions

Junior level  
 Girls' doubles

 Mixed doubles

Senior level

Women's doubles

{|  class="wikitable" style="font-size: 90%; text-align:center"
! rowspan="2" | Tournament !! colspan="6" | BWF Superseries / Grand Prix !! colspan="5" | BWF World Tour !! rowspan="2" | Best
|- 
! 2012 !! 2013 !! 2014 !! 2015 !! 2016 !! 2017 !! 2018 !! 2019 !! 2020 !! 2021 !! 2022
|-
| align=left | Syed Modi International
| A
| style=color:#ccc | NH
| colspan="2" | A
| bgcolor=AFEEEE | 1R
| colspan="3" | A
| colspan="2" style=color:#ccc | NH
| A
| bgcolor=AFEEEE | 1R ('16)
|-
| align=left | German Open
| colspan="3" | A
| bgcolor=D8BFD8 | F
| A
| bgcolor=FFEBCD | QF
| colspan="2" | A
| colspan="2" style=color:#ccc | NH
| A
| bgcolor=D8BFD8 | F ('15)
|-
| align=left | All England Open
| colspan="3" | A
| 2015; bgcolor=F0F8FF | Q2
| bgcolor=AFEEEE| 2R
| bgcolor=AFEEEE | 1R
| colspan="5" | A
| bgcolor=AFEEEE|2R ('16)
|-
| align=left | Swiss Open
| colspan="5" | A
| bgcolor=FFEBCD | QF
| colspan="2" | A
| style=color:#ccc | NH
| colspan="2" | A
| bgcolor=FFEBCD | QF ('17)
|-
| align=left | Korea Masters
| colspan="3" | A
| bgcolor=FFEBCD | QF
| colspan="4" | A
| colspan="2" style=color:#ccc | NH
| A
| bgcolor=FFEBCD | QF ('15)
|-
| align=left | Thailand Open
| colspan="6" | A
| bgcolor=AFEEEE | 1R
| colspan="2" | A
| style=color:#ccc | NH
| A
| bgcolor=AFEEEE | 1R ('18)
|-
| align=left | Indonesia Masters
| bgcolor=AFEEEE | 1R
| bgcolor=FFEBCD | QF
| bgcolor=FFEBCD | QF
| bgcolor=AFEEEE | 2R
| bgcolor=FFFF00 | SF
| style=color:#ccc | NH
| colspan="5" | A
| bgcolor=FFFF00 |SF ('16)
|-
| align=left | Indonesia Open
| bgcolor=AFEEEE | 1R
| 2013; bgcolor=F0F8FF | Q2
| 2014; bgcolor=F0F8FF | Q2
| A
| bgcolor=AFEEEE | 1R
| bgcolor=FFEBCD | QF
| bgcolor=AFEEEE | 1R
| A
| style=color:#ccc | NH
| colspan="2" | A
| bgcolor=FFEBCD | QF ('17)
|-
| align=left | Malaysia Open
| colspan="5" | A
| bgcolor=AFEEEE | 2R
| colspan="2" | A
| colspan="2" style=color:#ccc | NH
| A
| bgcolor=AFEEEE | 2R ('17)
|-
| align=left | Malaysia Masters
| A
| bgcolor=FFEBCD | QF
| colspan="2" | A
| bgcolor=AFEEEE | 1R
| colspan="4" | A
| style=color:#ccc | NH
| A
| bgcolor=FFEBCD | QF ('13)
|-
| align=left | Singapore Open
| colspan="4" | A
| bgcolor=FFEBCD | QF
| bgcolor=AFEEEE | 1R
| bgcolor=AFEEEE | 1R
| A
| colspan="2" style=color:#ccc | NH
| A
| bgcolor=FFEBCD | QF ('16)
|-
| align=left | Chinese Taipei Open
| A
| bgcolor=AFEEEE | 1R
| colspan="2" | A
| bgcolor=AFEEEE | 2R
| A
| bgcolor=AFEEEE | 2R
| A
| colspan="2" style=color:#ccc | NH
| A
| bgcolor=AFEEEE | 2R ('16, '18)
|-
| align=left | Vietnam Open
| colspan="2" | A
| bgcolor=00FF00 | W
| A
| bgcolor=00FF00 | W
| colspan="3" | A
| colspan="2" style=color:#ccc | NH
| A
| bgcolor=00FF00 | W ('14, '16)
|-
| align=left | Indonesia Masters Super 100
| colspan="6" style=color:#ccc | NA
| bgcolor=AFEEEE | 1R
| bgcolor=AFEEEE | 1R
| colspan="2" style=color:#ccc | NH
| bgcolor=AFEEEE | 2R
| bgcolor=AFEEEE | 2R ('22)
|-
| align=left | Denmark Open
| colspan="4" | A
| bgcolor=AFEEEE | 1R
| colspan="6" | A
| bgcolor=AFEEEE | 1R ('16)
|-
| align=left | French Open
| colspan="4" | A
| bgcolor=FFEBCD | QF| colspan="3" | A
| style=color:#ccc | NH
| colspan="2" | A
| bgcolor=FFEBCD | QF ('16)
|-
| align=left | Macau Open
| colspan="3" | A
| bgcolor=FFEBCD | QF
| bgcolor=AFEEEE | 2R
| A
| bgcolor=AFEEEE | 1R
| A
| colspan="3" style=color:#ccc | NH
| bgcolor=FFEBCD |QF ('15)
|-
| align=left | Hong Kong Open
| colspan="4" | A
| bgcolor=AFEEEE | 2R| colspan="3" | A
| colspan="3" style=color:#ccc | NH
| bgcolor=AFEEEE | 2R ('16)
|-
| align=left | Australian Open
| colspan="4" | A
| bgcolor=AFEEEE | 1R
| A
| bgcolor=FFEBCD | QF
| A
| colspan="2" style=color:#ccc | NH
| 
| bgcolor=FFEBCD | QF ('18)
|-
| align=left | New Zealand Open
| style=color:#ccc | NH
| colspan="4" | A
| bgcolor=AFEEEE | 1R
| bgcolor=AFEEEE | 1R
| A
| colspan="3" style=color:#ccc | NH
| bgcolor=AFEEEE | 1R ('17, '18)
|-
| align=left | China Open
| colspan="4" | A
| bgcolor=AFEEEE | 2R
| colspan="3" | A
| colspan="3" style=color:#ccc | NH
| bgcolor=AFEEEE | 2R ('16)
|-
| align=left | China Masters
| colspan="4" | A
| bgcolor=FFFF00 | SF
| colspan="3" | A
| colspan="3" style=color:#ccc | NH
| bgcolor=FFFF00 | SF ('16)
|-
| align=left | Dutch Open
| colspan="2" | A
| bgcolor=FFEBCD | QF| colspan="5" | A
| style=color:#ccc | NH
| colspan="2" style=color:#ccc | NA
| bgcolor=FFEBCD | QF ('14)
|-
| align=left | Hyderabad Open
| colspan="6" style=color:#ccc | NH
| bgcolor=FFEBCD | QF
| A
| colspan="3" style=color:#ccc | NH
| bgcolor=FFEBCD | QF ('18)
|-
| align=left | Lingshui China Masters
| colspan="6" style=color:#ccc | NH
| bgcolor=AFEEEE | 1R
| A
| colspan="3" style=color:#ccc | NH
| bgcolor=AFEEEE | 1R ('18)
|-
| align=left | Thailand Masters
| colspan="4" style=color:#ccc | NH
| A
| bgcolor=FFFF00 | SF| colspan="3" | A
| colspan="2" style=color:#ccc | NH
| bgcolor=FFFF00 | SF ('17)
|-
| align=left | Year-end ranking| 135
| 58
| 45
| 57
| 15
| 36
| 93
| 282
| 273
| 377
| 
| 13
|-
! Tournament !! 2012 !! 2013 !! 2014 !! 2015 !! 2016 !! 2017 !! 2018 !! 2019 !! 2020 !! 2021 !! 2022 !! Best
|}

Mixed doubles

 Record against selected opponents 
Women's doubles results with Della Destiara Haris against World Superseries finalists, World Championship semifinalists, and Olympic quarterfinalists:

  Tian Qing & Zhao Yunlei 0–1
  Christinna Pedersen & Kamilla Rytter Juhl 0–1
  Misaki Matsutomo & Ayaka Takahashi 1–0
  Shizuka Matsuo & Mami Naito '1–0
  Jung Kyung-eun & Shin Seung-chan 2-3
  Vivian Hoo Kah Mun & Woon Khe Wei '''1–1

References 

1996 births
Living people
People from Sleman Regency
Sportspeople from Special Region of Yogyakarta
Indonesian female badminton players
Competitors at the 2017 Southeast Asian Games
Southeast Asian Games bronze medalists for Indonesia
Southeast Asian Games medalists in badminton
21st-century Indonesian women
20th-century Indonesian women